Neradnovci (Prekmurje Slovene: Maranovci) is a small settlement in the Municipality of Gornji Petrovci in the Prekmurje region of Slovenia, close to the border with Hungary.

References

External links
Neradnovci on Geopedia

Populated places in the Municipality of Gornji Petrovci